Ribeira Grande is a municipality in the northern part of the island of São Miguel in the Portuguese Azores. The population in 2011 was 32,112, in an area of 180.15 km2. The municipal seat is located in the civil parish of Matriz, with a population of about 4000 inhabitants, part of the urbanized core of what is commonly referred to as the city of Ribeira Grande (six civil parishes, about 10000 inhabitants).

History

The first settlers arrived on the island by the end of the second quarter of the 15th century. The expansion of settlement occurred after initiatives by the island's third donatary captain, Rui Gonçalves da Câmara (son of João Gonçalves Zarco, resulting in northern colonies from peoples from Madeira. Although the early settlement of Ribeira Grande is mired in murkiness owing to the lack of resources, the best sources indicate that settlement began in the late-15th or early-16th centuries. The first settlers to this region are to the northern part of the island by the end of the 15th century. On arriving, these colonists established their settlement along the ravine, which they eventually named after the river course: Ribeira Grande. What is certain is that before 1507, in the urban areas of today's Ribeira Grande, there were already colonists of a "certain social stature" living and raising cattle. One of these was Antão Rodrigues da Câmara, the bastard son Rui Gonçalves da Câmara, donatary-captain of São Miguel. His parentage was legitimized on 6 January 1499, and his property (situated in Ribeirinha) was described as an estate, with lands of woodlands, pasture and waters, with houses supported by granaries, haylofts, pastel engine, vineyards and orchards, received as part of his morgadia dated 17 April 1508.

The construction of the isolated Port of Santo Iria began at the beginning of the 16th century.

Even before being raised to the status of town (at the beginning of the 17th century), the population had already grown dramatically. This was recorded in a 1507 accord that established a master builder for the new church, assumed to be the parochial church of Nossa Senhora da Estrela. The elevation of Ponta Delgada to "town" in 1499, must have influenced the resident nobles of Ribeira Grande, who moved to have the same authority established for their burgh. Although the people involved were unfamiliar, Gaspar Frutuoso indicated that King Manuel I conceded to the locality of Ribeira Grande the privilege of town on 4 August 1507, that included a league around the centre, counted from the [central] pillory, comprising one parish (called Nossa Senhora da Purificação or Nossa Senhora da Estrela). It was Lopo Arês who brought the signed document from Lisbon, when he returned in 1508.

On 3 April 1508, then donatary captain, Rui Gonçalves da Câmara, oversaw the swearing in of Jorge da Mota (ordinary judge of Vila Franca do Campo) and João do Penedo and António Carneiro, noblemen of Ribeira Grande, to select twelve residents to vote on the six elected officials for the new town. It was this process that eventually elected the first municipal council, that served until 24 June 1509.

Writing at the beginning of the 15th century, Gaspar Frutuoso wrote about the settlement, in these terms:
"The town of Ribeira Grande, noble by its residents, rich in its lands, well shaded with its fields and fertile with its fruits, is situated in and around its great ravine, from which it received its name, almost in the middle of the island, in a large bay in a band of the north, at the feet of a sierra very fresh [that is near its plain, is a thing highlights the other, making its grouply more gracious then other towns]; and the ravine cuts the town in two parts, of a small time, because until the year one thousand and fifty-five there was no bridge to the western part to more than two houses only. But, later after much growth, that it is today the largest town, richer and more people then there are in all the Bishopric of Angra. Before it was suffragate of Vila Franco do Campo, until the King Dom Manuel, explain on his pillory for all parts around." 
Settlers continued to be sent to the area of Ribeira Grande, by Lopo de Ares, owing to the location's access to water and the pre-existing colonists that already provided land rents. Since it was located far from the provincial capital of Vila Franca, the town was elevated to the status of town by King Manuel in 1507.

Until 1515, the western margin of the Ribeira Grande river was occupied by just two homes. A few years later, from a land record of 4 July 1520, there was a contract for stone to build a bridge alongside the main square, awarded to Fernão Álvares.

From 1536, the monastery of Jesus was founded, in order to shelter the youth of wealthy governing families, resulting in the appearance of the toponymy Rua das Freiras and Largo das Freiras. This was a reflection of the growth of the settlement, which continued to expand regularly; in 1515 there were 200 homes; the parish of Nossa Senhora da Estrela had 800 by 1576 (on this date there were 1018 homes and 3534 souls in the municipality; and 1237 homes by 1593, with indications that the population of the municipality rounded 5000 inhabitants by this time. The growth of the demographics of the municipality necessitated that the ecclesiastical administration create new parishes, resulting in the creation of the parishes of São Pedro (in Ribeira Seca) by 1577 by bishop D. Gaspar de Faria.

Since its formation the town employed a arruador, who was responsible for "designing" the grounds and roads and houses that were made. Pêro Teixeira, who died in 1555, was the first, and was succeeded on 9 February by his successor. At the time of Pêro Teixeira's death town records point to the existence of various roadways established under his authority: Ruas de João do Outeiro, Rua da Conceição, Rua de Lourenço Gonçalves, Rua da Bica, Rua do Santo Espírito, Rua de Francisco Gonçalves Cheira-Dinheiro, Rua das Pedras, Rua do Rosário, Rua de João da Horta and references to the cobble-stoning other roads. A large part of these roads continue in the current toponymy of the town. Similarly, the a clock was established in the tower of the church in 1555 and in 1578, a bell was installed in the municipal palace tower and a new butcher appeared, attesting to the development of the urban metropolo. In other parts of the municipality, such as Rabo de Peixe, its primitive parochial church was substituted by a larger three-nave structure, that presented an ornate painting of St. Peter attributed to Vasco Fernandes (1480-1543).

Between 1612 and 1626, the Convent of São Francisco was constructed, reflecting the importance of the northern community. This growth mandated the reorganization of the island, resulting in the division of São Miguel into three municipalities: Ponta Delgada, Vila Franca do Campo and Ribeira Grande.

The aspiration to obtain the status of city began in 1852; plans for the future city were then constituted by the parishes of Nossa Senhora da Estrela  (today Matriz) and Nossa Senhora da Conceição (the actual Conceição).  But, nothing ever became of this project. During the intervening years the continuous growth and expansion of the burgh continued: this resulted in the construction of the Church of the Misericórdia (18th century); and need to construct a new link across the main ravine. It was during the 19th century, that the bridge of eight arcs was completed, to complement the old one arch bridge at the main square. Further expansion of the road network continued: the Rua das Pedras (today the Rua Sousa e Silva) was open, as was the Avenida Camões and the new access to the port of Santa Iria was inaugurated.

It was only on 29 June 1981 that the municipal centre obtained the status of city.

Geography

Physical geography

The municipality is one of the six that constitute the island of São Miguel. It occupies most of the northern section of the island, from the Atlantic coast to the volcanic mountains in the center of the island. It is the only municipality on São Miguel to share boundaries with all five other municipalities: it is bounded by Nordeste (east), Povoação (southeast), Ponta Delgada (west), Lagoa and Vila Franca do Campo (south). All the municipalities are linked by several regional roads that circle the island or cross the mountains in the central section.

The relief is dominated by the Serra de Água de Pau, which includes a caldeira occupied by the Lagoa do Fogo (Lake of Fire). The volcanic geology, associated to the occurrence of many springs in the foothills, have been responsible for the fast creeks flowing in deep ravines, one of which gave its name to the town. Other volcanic manifestations in the area are fumaroles, such as Caldeira Velha or Caldeiras, and mineral hot springs at Lombadas, Gramas and Ladeira da Velha.

In addition to the river valleys and mountains, there are several beaches, including the main beaches in Ribeira Grande (Santa Bárbara and Monte Verde), Moinhos Beach (at Porto Formoso) and Viola Beach (in the shadow of Lomba da Maia).

Human geography

The municipality is divided into 14 sub-regional administrative authorities, or freguesias (civil parishes):
 Calhetas
 Conceição (Ribeira Grande)
 Fenais da Ajuda
 Lomba da Maia
 Lomba de São Pedro
 Maia
 Matriz (Ribeira Grande), the main urbanized area, and seat of the municipality, it has a population of just under 4000 inhabitants, and is the socio-cultural centre (location of many of the historical architectural buildings/structures);  
 Pico da Pedra
 Porto Formoso
 Rabo de Peixe
 Ribeira Seca
 Ribeirinha
 Santa Bárbara
 São Brás

The largest parish in population (and density) is Rabo de Peixe, while the smallest is São Brás. In area, the largest parish is Maia, and the smallest is Calhetas. The highest village is Lomba da Maia.

Twin towns — sister cities

Ribeira Grande is twinned with:

 Somerville, United States
 Fall River, United States
 East Providence, United States
 Laval, Canada
 Porto Alegre, Brazil
 Ribeira Grande de Santiago, Cape Verde
 Paul, Cape Verde
 Porto Novo, Cape Verde
 Ribeira Grande, Cape Verde

Architecture

Civic
 Arquipelago Center of the Arts
 Augusto César Ferreira Cabido Home
 Estate of Boa Viagem
 Estate of Mafoma
 Estate of Nossa Senhora do Vencimento
 Estate of São Sebastião
 Judicial Court of Ribeira Grande
 Lighthouse of Ponta do Cintrão
 Municipal Palace/Hall of Ribeira Grande
 Philharmonic Society Progressive of the North
 Rabo de Peixe Fishermens' Barrio
 Santa Bárbara Parochial and Social Centre
 Theatre Ribeiragrandense
 Thermal Springs of Caldeiras

Churches
 Seventh-day Adventist Church of Lomba de São Pedro
 Church of Espírito Santo
 Church of the Divino Espírito Santo
 Church of Nossa Senhora dos Aflitos
 Church of Nossa Senhora da Boa Viagem
 Church of Nossa Senhora da Conceição
 Church of Nossa Senhora das Dores
 Church of Nossa Senhora da Estrela
 Church of Nossa Senhora da Graça
 Church of Nossa Senhora dos Prazeres
 Church of Nossa Senhora do Rosário
 Church of Nossa Senhora das Vitórias
 Church of Santíssimo Salvador do Mundo
 Church of Santos Reis Magos
 Church of São Brás
 Church of São Pedro
 Church of São Pedro
 Church of Senhor Bom Jesus
 Convent of Nossa Senhora de Guadalupe
 Convent of Nossa Senhora da Ajuda
 Hermitage of Nossa Senhora da Conceição das Vinhas
 Hermitage of Nossa Senhora da Salvação
 Hermitage of Nossa Senhora das Dores
 Hermitage of Nossa Senhora do Rosário
 Hermitage of Nossa Senhora de Fátima
 Hermitage of Santa Luzia
 Hermitage of Santo André
 Hermitage of Bom Successo
 Monastery of Nossa Senhora das Mercês
 Passos da Via Sacra da Ribeira Grande

References

Notes

Sources

External links

 Photos from Ribeira Grande

 
Municipalities of the Azores
Populated places established in the 1500s
Municipalities of São Miguel Island